= Sergio Mies =

Brazilian physician and researcher

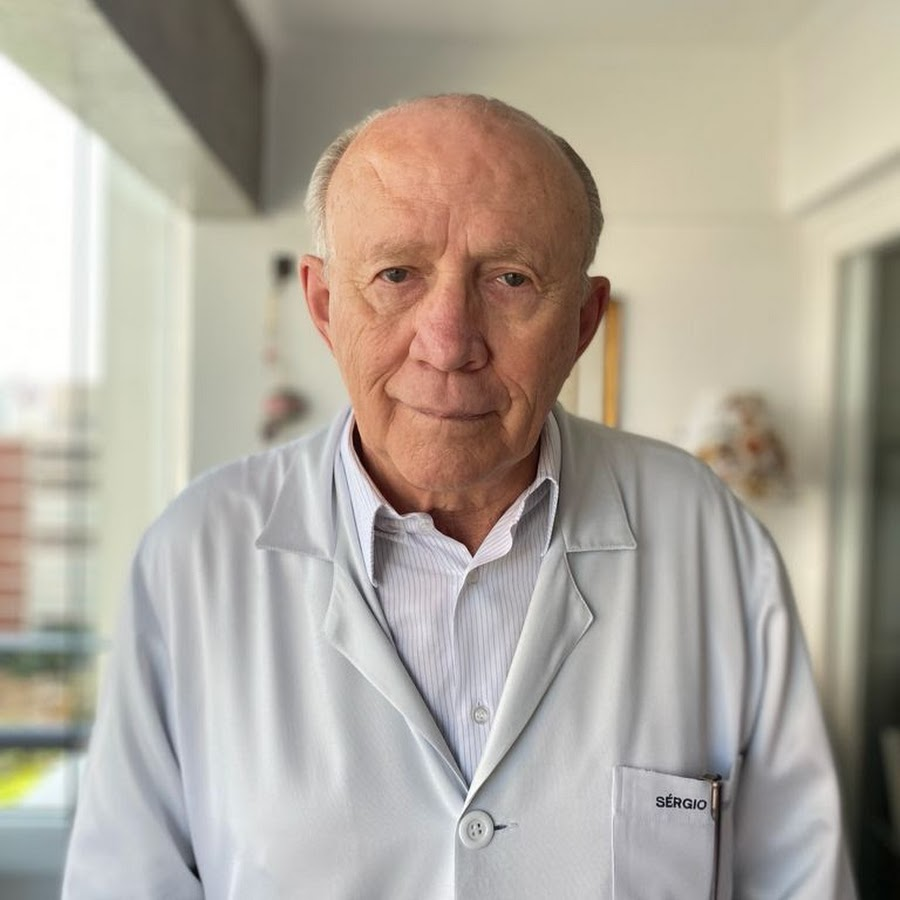
- Born: São Paulo, Brazil
- Citizenship: Brazil

Sergio Mies is a Brazilian physician and researcher who served as a professor of surgery at the Universidade de São Paulo from 1976 to 2023.

== Early life and education ==
Mies was born in São Paulo, Brazil. He graduated with a degree in medicine from the Universidade de São Paulo in 1968. Later, he completed a medical residency in surgery from 1969 to 1970. He earned his Ph.D. in medicine in 1973 at the medical school of the Universidade de São Paulo and his thesis focused on the hemodynamics of liver transplantation.

== Career ==
During his early career, Mies focused his research primarily on the impacts of schistosomiasis on liver functioning. He worked as a professor from 1976 to 2023 in the surgery department of the Universidade de São Paulo.

== Research ==
Mies was instrumental in developing the living-donor liver transplantation technique, in which a segment of the liver is transplanted from a living donor to a recipient. Following the procedure, the livers of both the donor and the recipient regenerate.

== Selected publications ==
- Raia, S.; Nery, J. R.; Mies, S. (August 26, 1989). "Liver transplantation from live donors". Lancet. 2 (8661): 497. doi:10.1016/s0140-6736(89)92101-6. PMID 2570198.
- G, Levy; P, Burra; A, Cavallari; C, Duvoux; J, Lake; Ad, Mayer; S, Mies; Sg, Pollard; E, Varo; F, Villamil; A, Johnston (March 27, 2002). "Improved clinical outcomes for liver transplant recipients using cyclosporine monitoring based on 2-hr post-dose levels (C2)". Transplantation. 73 (6): 953–959. doi:10.1097/00007890-200203270-00022. PMID 11923699.
- Lima, Emerson Q.; Zanetta, Dirce M. T.; Castro, Isaac; Massarollo, Paulo C. B.; Mies, Sergio; Machado, Marcelo M.; Yu, Luis (July 12, 2003). "Risk factors for development of acute renal failure after liver transplantation". Renal Failure. 25 (4): 553–560. doi:10.1081/jdi-120022546. PMID 12911159.
- Mies, S. (June 12, 1998). "Transplante de fígado". Revista da Associação Médica Brasileira. 44 (2): 127–134. doi:10.1590/S0104-42301998000200011. PMID 9699331.
- S, Mies; Ob, Neto; A, Beer; Ce, Baía; F, Alfieri; Lm, Pereira; Mj, Sette; S, Raia (April 12, 1997). "Systemic and hepatic hemodynamics in hepatosplenic Manson's schistosomiasis with and without propranolol". Digestive Diseases and Sciences. 42 (4): 751–761. doi:10.1023/a:1018803911915. PMID 9125644.

== Awards and recognition ==
Mies is the receipent of the following awards and recognitions:

- 1979: Fernando Vaz Award
- 1988: Jorge Toledo Award
- 1996: Alfredo Monteiro Award
- 1996: Francisco Javier de Balmis Award
- 2000: Oswaldo Cruz Foundation award for organ transplantation
- 2004: Oswaldo Cruz Award
- 2007: Honorary Citizen of Sorocaba, City Council of Sorocaba
- 2008: Honorary Citizen of Maceió, City Council of Maceió
- 2009: Honorary Doctor of the Oswaldo Cruz German Hospital
